Japan's ambassador in Rome is accredited to Albania, while an honorary consulate in Tirana assists Japanese interests in Albania.

Japan now has an embassy in Tirana. Takada Mitsuyuki is ambassador of Japan to Albania.

Albania has an embassy in Tokyo.

History

Diplomatic relations were established in April, 1922 with the recognition of the new independent Albanian state from Japan. On June 20, 1930, the First Commercial Treaty between the two countries was signed.
In 1935 the Kingdom of Albania opened the Honorary Consulate in Osaka. After the World War II the relations were frozen and they were re-established on March, 1981.
In December 2005 the Embassy of the Republic of Albania was opened in Tokyo and in March 2016 the Japanese Government adopted the decision to open the embassy in Tirana (officially opening in January 2017)

Economic relations

Albania considers Japan as one of the most important trade partners in the far east. They have signed many bilateral agreements, which mainly consist on helping the future development of the Albanian Economy

Trade of Albania with Japan:
Exports to Japan from Albania: ¥ 153 million
Imports from Japan to Albania: ¥ 252 million

Japanese development aid
Japan's Official Development Assistance to Albania amounts 25.278 billion yen in total, or approximately 179 million EUR (as of May 2014)
Grant Assistance: 4.98 billion yen
Yen Loans: 18.092 billion yen
Technical Cooperation: 2.206 billion yen

Other bilateral agreements
The two countries have signed more than 15 bilateral agreements and most of them are focused on the development of the Economy of Albania. In September 2007 an agreement was reached on visa abolition of diplomatic passports with Japan and it entered into force on 10.12.2007.

See also
 Foreign relations of Albania
 Foreign relations of Japan

References

External links 
 Embassy of Japan in Albania
 Embassy of Albania in Japan

 
Japan
Albania